Rupal Peak is a mountain in Pakistan's western Himalayas. The peak is located just south of Nanga Parbat on the Rupal Valley and is sometimes climbed by mountaineers as they acclimatize for higher local peaks. Despite its unique beauty, steep north face and impressive height, Rupal is greatly overshadowed by Nanga Parbat, the Mazeno Wall, and the mighty Rupal Face. To its west lie Laila Peak and Shaigiri, and to its north flows the Rupal Glacier which later forms the Rupal River.

See also
 List of mountains in Pakistan

External links
 Northern Pakistan - highly detailed placemarks in Google Earth

Five-thousanders of the Himalayas
Mountains of Gilgit-Baltistan
Astore District